Nitin Tomar is a professional Indian kabaddi player. He leads  franchise in the Pro Kabaddi League Season 5 and is a player of Indian Kabaddi Team (men's division). He is currently member of the UP Yoddha team. He was the highest Sold player at Pro Kabaddi League Season 5 auction sold for 93 lakhs to UP Yoddha

Early life and background
Tomar hails from Malakpur village in Baghpat district of Uttar Pradesh. He studied at Maharishi Dayanand Public School. He is from a wrestling background, but had to pursue kabaddi due to lack wrestling training facilities in his school. His uncle Rajiv Tomar is an Arjuna awardee wrestler.

As of July 2019, Tomar is pursuing a career in the Indian Navy. He is a resident of Mumbai.

Career

Nitin is a left raider. He made his Pro Kabaddi League debut in 2015 with Bengal Warriors. In 2017, He was sold at 93 lakhs to UP Yoddha in PKL Auction. He became the first player to captain The Yoddhas as they were playing their first season in 2017. He was sold to Puneri Paltan in 2019 Auction.

He returned to his old franchise UP Yoddhas in PKL 2022-23.

Nitin played for the Indian Team in the 2016 Kabaddi World Cup.

References

1995 births
Living people
Indian kabaddi players
Sportspeople from Baghpat district
Pro Kabaddi League players